St_Michael's, Chenies#Bedford_Chapel
 Bedford Chapel, Bloomsbury
 Bedford Chapel, Golders Green Crematorium